Mouriri is a genus of plants in the family Melastomataceae.

Species include:
 Mouriri completens, (Pitt.) Burret
 Mouriri gleasoniana, Standl.
 Mouriri laxiflora, Morley
 Mouriri panamensis, Morley
 Mouriri guianensis, Aublet

 
Melastomataceae genera
Taxonomy articles created by Polbot